Celeste Drake is an American union official and trade expert. On April 27, 2021, President Joe Biden made her the Director of Made in America at the Office of Management and Budget.

She was formerly head of the Directors Guild of America.

References

Year of birth missing (living people)
Living people
UCLA School of Law alumni
University of California, Los Angeles alumni
California Democrats
AFL–CIO people
Biden administration personnel